Wakefield Township is a civil township of Gogebic County in the U.S. state of Michigan.  The population was 305 at the 2010 census, down from 364 at the 2000 census.

Communities
The City of Wakefield is situated within the township, but is administratively autonomous.
Duke was a lumbertown in this township with a station on the Duluth, South Shore and Atlantic Railroad.  It had a post office from 1901 until 1906.
A post office opened November 7, 1891 and was discontinued July 31, 1923. The office reopened and operated from January 12, 1925, until August 14, 1926.
It began as a lumber camp in 1925.
It had a post office from 1906 until 1916. There is a sign approximately  miles east of the former town site that reads "Tula".

Geography

Demographics
As of the census of 2000, there were 364 people, 161 households, and 110 families residing in the township.  The population density was 2.0 per square mile (0.8/km).  There were 376 housing units at an average density of 2.1 per square mile (0.8/km).  The racial makeup of the township was 97.80% White, 0.82% Asian, and 1.37% from two or more races. Hispanic or Latino of any race were 0.82% of the population.

There were 161 households, out of which 21.1% had children under the age of 18 living with them, 57.8% were married couples living together, 7.5% had a female householder with no husband present, and 31.1% were non-families. 26.1% of all households were made up of individuals, and 11.8% had someone living alone who was 65 years of age or older.  The average household size was 2.26 and the average family size was 2.70.

In the township the population was spread out, with 18.1% under the age of 18, 3.3% from 18 to 24, 23.9% from 25 to 44, 31.3% from 45 to 64, and 23.4% who were 65 years of age or older.  The median age was 47 years. For every 100 females, there were 104.5 males.  For every 100 females age 18 and over, there were 104.1 males.

The median income for a household in the township was $31,875, and the median income for a family was $37,750. Males had a median income of $28,542 versus $23,295 for females. The per capita income for the township was $17,400.  About 5.3% of families and 9.4% of the population were below the poverty line, including 12.7% of those under age 18 and 14.1% of those age 65 or over.

References

Notes

Sources

Townships in Gogebic County, Michigan
Townships in Michigan
Michigan populated places on Lake Superior